This list is of paintings designated in the category of  for the Prefecture of '''Miyagi.

National Cultural Properties
As of 1 July 2019, two properties have been designated Important Cultural Properties, being of national significance.

Prefectural Cultural Properties
As of 1 May 2019, fourteen properties have been designated at a prefectural level.

Municipal Cultural Properties
Properties designated at a municipal level include:

See also
 Cultural Properties of Japan
 List of National Treasures of Japan (paintings)
 Japanese painting
 List of Historic Sites of Japan (Miyagi)
 List of Cultural Properties of Japan - historical materials (Miyagi)
 Tōhoku History Museum

References

External links
  Cultural Properties in Miyagi Prefecture

Cultural Properties,Mie
Cultural Properties,Paintings
Paintings,Mie
Lists of paintings